Waves is the eighth studio release by American duo Azure Ray, consisting of Maria Taylor and Orenda Fink. It was released on October 26, 2018, on Flower Moon Records.

Background 
After a five-year hiatus following the release of As Above So Below, the band announced in October 2017 that their self-titled debut and Burn and Shiver were now on Taylor's label. A few weeks later, a cryptic message teasing an "important announcement" was posted to the band's social media accounts and on November 17, 2017, Taylor and Fink announced they would once again reunite for a one-off show in Los Angeles at the Lodge Room on January 20, 2018. In August 2018, a second reunion show, this time in their hometown of Omaha, was announced for October 26, 2018.

On September 26, 2018 Stereogum announced their new EP and first new record in 6 years, Waves and premiered a new single, "Palindrome," calling it a "mournful string-driven ballad which offers the best of the band's spectral harmonies, woodsy storytelling and aching wisdom." Billboard premiered the Alan Tanner directed video for "Palindrome" on October 19, 2018. Billboard also premiered a new recording of "Hold on Love" from their 2003 record of the same name, which the band said "reflects the live version that we came to love playing through the years." KCRW premiered the video for the "hauntingly beautiful" "Last Summer In Omaha" on October 25, 2018.

Track listing 
All songs written by Azure Ray, except where otherwise listed.

 "Palindrome" 
 "Last Summer In Omaha"
 "Nightswimming" (R.E.M. cover)
 "Hold On Love (2018 Version)"
 "Palindrome (Reprise)"

Personnel
 Additional appearances by Louis Schefano, Andy LeMaster, Tiffany Osborn
 Azure Ray and Louis Schefano – co-production
 Louis Schefano – engineer
 Andy LeMaster - mixing
 Doug Van Sloun  - mastering
 Jess Ewald – cover photograph
 Ryan Dwyer – creative direction

References 

Azure Ray albums
2018 EPs
Dream pop EPs